Super Sunset is the fourth extended play (EP) by Canadian singer and songwriter Alexandra Hughes, known professionally as Allie X. It was released on October 29, 2018, by Twin Music. The EP follows the release of her debut studio album CollXtion II (2017), and was inspired by Hughes' tumultuous experiences since moving to Los Angeles. The concept was illustrated by three archetypes: "Sci-Fi Girl", the "Hollywood Starlet", and the "Nun".

Singles
All of the tracks featured on Super Sunset, except for the intro and interlude, were released as singles; Hughes explained that she "felt a very close connection to each song" and wanted them "to have their own moments."

Critical reception
Julian Baldsing of The Line of Best Fit praised Hughes' songwriting and vocals, and said "Super Sunset excels by proving that regardless of how much of Allie X the human is revealed, there’s so much more to the artist that has yet to be discovered.".

The EP was included on GQs list of the best albums of 2018, Idolators list of the best EPs of 2018 at number 5, and Paper listed it as the 18th best album of 2018.

Track listing

Notes
"Super Sunset Intro" and "Super Sunset Interlude" contain a sample of "Local Forecast – Elevator" by Kevin MacLeod.

Release history

References

2018 EPs
Allie X albums
EPs by Canadian artists
Dance-pop EPs
Electropop EPs
Synthwave albums